Watney Combe & Reid was a leading brewery in London. At its peak in the 1930s it was a constituent of the FT 30 index of leading companies on the London Stock Exchange. It produced Watney's Red Barrel.

History

The Watney family were the main partners in the Stag Brewery, Victoria, for much of the 19th century.  In 1837 James Watney became a partner in the brewery, followed by his sons James and Norman in 1856.  On his death in 1884, the brewery became a private limited company.

In 1889 James Watney & Co., acquired the Mortlake Brewery (latterly referred to as the Stag Brewery of Mortlake), which had been owned by Charles James Philips and James Wigan since the 1840s.

In 1898 the company merged with Combe Delafield and Co. and Reid and Co., and was subsequently known as Watney Combe and Reid. The amalgamated company was the largest brewer in London. The Combe brewery in Longacre and the Reid brewery in Clerkenwell closed almost immediately, and production was concentrated on the Watney Stag Brewery in Pimlico. The company had an annual output of 1.8 million hectolitres (some 39.5 million imperial gallons).

Watney Mann was formed in 1958 with the merger of Watney, Combe, Reid & Co. Ltd with Mann, Crossman & Paulin Ltd.

When the Stag Brewery in Victoria was demolished in 1959 the name was transferred to Mortlake Brewery.

The business acquired other brewers, including Wilsons of Manchester, Phipps NBC of Northampton, Samuel Webster & Sons of Halifax and Ushers of Trowbridge, before being taken over by Grand Metropolitan, a hotels and catering group, in 1972 and closed in 1979.

Watney's Red Barrel 
Watney's Red Barrel was a bitter which sold highly in the United Kingdom during the 1960s and 1970s. It was introduced in 1931 as an export keg beer that could travel for long distances by being made stable through filtering and pasteurising, as such it was the first keg beer. It was reformulated and relaunched as "Watney's Red" in 1971.

A 3.9% abv pale lager called Watney's Red Barrel was sold by Sleeman Breweries until 1997 and a 6.0% beer with the same name is still brewed by Alken-Maes.

Advertising
For many years, Watney's advertised with the strapline "What we want is Watney's".

The company sponsored the Watney Cup association football tournament from 1970 to 1973.

References

External links
Access to Archives: Files held at the London Metropolitan Archives on Watney Come Reid and Co Ltd and Watney Mann Ltd 
Illustration of label of Combe Delafield & Co., Best London Porter

1898 establishments in England
1972 disestablishments in England
1972 mergers and acquisitions
Breweries in London
British companies established in 1884
British companies established in 1898
Companies based in the London Borough of Richmond upon Thames
Companies formerly listed on the London Stock Exchange
Defunct breweries of the United Kingdom
Food and drink companies disestablished in 1972
Food and drink companies established in 1898
History of the London Borough of Richmond upon Thames
Watney family